What Would Buffy Do?: The Vampire Slayer as Spiritual Guide is a 2004 book relating to the fictional Buffyverse established by TV series, Buffy and Angel.

Book description

Jana Riess argues that despite the show being ostensibly secular in some ways, it takes on some very spiritual elements. Riess attempts to get to the heart of the show's values. She uses as a key example Buffy's gradual embrace of self-sacrifice for a greater good instead of "normal" teenage commitment to materialism. Such self-sacrifice is typical among many key religious figures.

The idea of redemption is also an important theme in the show, which is dealt with by characters such as Angel, who has to begin to make amends for his past misdeeds as a vampire; Faith, the rogue slayer driven by self-hatred and envy; and Spike, the vampire whose love for a slayer causes him to seek to regain his soul.

The book also includes an interview with Eliza Dushku.

Contents

The book contains three main sections. The first deals with issues of "Personal Spirituality" (Chapters 1–5). The second section, "Companions on the Journey", expands to look at relationships with families, friends, and mentors (Chapters 6–8). The final section, "Saving the World", looks at socially engaged spirituality (Chapters 9–11).

External links

Reviews
ChristianityToday.com
NimbleSpirit.com
Religion-Online.org
DarkWorlds.com
Phil-books.com - Review of this book

Articles
BBC.co.uk
"Scholars plan to espouse merits of Buffy the Vampire Slayer" (Tennessean.com).

Books about the Buffyverse
2004 non-fiction books